The Roberts Farm Historic and Archeological District (also known as the Theus-Roberts Farm) is a U.S. historic district (designated as such on November 2, 1995) located in Tallahassee, Florida.

History
The Roberts Farm was founded in 1803 by the Roberts family as a crop and dairy farm.

Current Day
The farm is currently in the process of being re-conserved by two sisters, one of which has been living in the family house and the other is in the process of building a tiny house.

They have goats, horses, fowl, and farm dogs and have been renting off plots of land for gardens.

References

External links
 Leon County listings at National Register of Historic Places

Geography of Tallahassee, Florida
National Register of Historic Places in Tallahassee, Florida
Historic districts on the National Register of Historic Places in Florida